Class of '99 was a short-term American alternative rock supergroup consisting of members from notable rock bands:
 Layne Staley of Alice in Chains as vocalist,
 Tom Morello of Rage Against the Machine as lead guitarist,
 Stephen Perkins of Jane's Addiction as drummer,
 Martyn LeNoble of Porno for Pyros as bassist,
 Matt Serletic producer of Matchbox Twenty and many others as keyboardist.

These five musicians collaborated to cover Pink Floyd's "Another Brick in the Wall (Part 2)" (as well as "Another Brick in the Wall (Part 1)") for the soundtrack to Robert Rodriguez's 1998 science-fiction horror film, The Faculty. Contrary to rumors and popular belief, the five musicians collaborated solely to cover the songs for the film and did not create a band or intend on releasing other new material.

In 1999, a single of both versions was released on the Sony International record label. It also contained Stabbing Westward's "Haunting Me". The "Another Brick in the Wall (Part 2)" video was directed by Jim Shea, and aired for the first time in January 1999.

As the recordings took place in November 1998, Class of '99 is now notable for being Staley's final appearance in the studio prior to his death from a drug overdose in April 2002.

Single chart positions 

Rock music supergroups
Musical groups established in 1999
1999 establishments in Washington (state)